Farzan Ashourzadeh Fallah (born November 25, 1996 in Tonekabon, Mazandaran, Iran) is an Iranian taekwondo practitioner. He won the gold medal in the flyweight division (-58 kg) at the 2014 Asian Games in Incheon, South Korea.
In 2016 he participated at the 2016 Summer Olympics but surprisingly lost in the 1/08-Finale against Omar Hajjami.

References

External links
 

Iranian male taekwondo practitioners
1996 births
Living people
Asian Games gold medalists for Iran
Asian Games bronze medalists for Iran
Asian Games medalists in taekwondo
Taekwondo practitioners at the 2014 Asian Games
Taekwondo practitioners at the 2018 Asian Games
Olympic taekwondo practitioners of Iran
Taekwondo practitioners at the 2016 Summer Olympics
Medalists at the 2014 Asian Games
Medalists at the 2018 Asian Games
People from Tonekabon
World Taekwondo Championships medalists
Asian Taekwondo Championships medalists
Sportspeople from Mazandaran province
21st-century Iranian people